

References

Laos